The Green Mosque (Pashto: شنه جومات) is a mosque in the city of Balkh, northern Afghanistan. It is believed to have been commissioned by the then ruler of the Eastern Timurid Empire, Shah Rukh, or by his wife Goharshad.

History
After Tamerlane's death in 1405, his empire fell apart with various tribes and warlords competing for dominance. The Black Sheep Turkmen destroyed the western empire in 1410 when they captured Baghdad, but in Persia and Transoxiana, Shahrukh was able to secure effective control from about 1409. His empire controlled the main trade routes between East and West, including the legendary Silk Road, and became immensely wealthy as a region to have had made adjustments to many of the local mosques and borrowing ideas for his own buildings that he built throughout his reign, also aspects of this building are a precursor to the famous Taj Mahal, as the similarities can be seen.

Architecture
The main building displays a typical Timurid architectural style. However, today much of the building itself has suffered heavy from neglect and damage by warring factions during the Soviet and Afghan civil wars. The main courtyard has been well preserved allowing people to pray in the open spaces. To the back of the building however little care has been given to the paving and gardens. The minaret has either collapsed due to the age of the building or could have been the act of aggression during wartime by the communists. Much of the tile work has disappeared and the wooden doors are in dire need of repair.

See also
 Balkh

References

Religious buildings and structures completed in 1421
15th-century mosques
Mosques in Afghanistan
Buildings and structures in Balkh Province
Balkh